John Alexander Gordon Charles Law (25 March 1923 – 19 August 2004) was an English first-class cricketer.

Law was born in British India at Bangalore in March 1923. He made his debut in first-class cricket in British India for the Europeans against the Indians in the 1940/41 Madras Presidency Matches. In early 1941, he made two first-class appearances for Madras in the Ranji Trophy. Law served in the Second World War after gaining an emergency commission in the Royal Artillery in March 1941. Later in 1941, he made a third appearance for Madras in the Ranji Trophy, and further appearances for the Europeans followed in the 1942/43, 1943/44 and 1944/45 Presidency Matches. 

After the war, Law studied in England at St Edmund Hall, Oxford. He made two first-class appearances for Oxford University against Lancashire and the touring New Zealanders at Oxford in 1949. In all he played nine first-class matches as a wicket-keeper, scoring 194 runs at an average of 11.41 with a highest score of 35. Behind the stumps he took 16 catches and made three stumpings.

Law died in Canada at Montreal in August 2004.

References

External links

1923 births
2004 deaths
People from Bangalore
English cricketers
Europeans cricketers
Tamil Nadu cricketers
British Army personnel of World War II
Royal Artillery officers
Alumni of St Edmund Hall, Oxford
Oxford University cricketers
British people in colonial India
British emigrants to Canada